L. dubia may refer to:
 Leucorrhinia dubia, the white-faced darter, a small dragonfly species
 Levenhookia dubia, the hairy stylewort, a plant species
 Lindernia dubia, the yellowseed false pimpernel or moist bank pimpernel, a flowering plant species

See also
 Dubia (disambiguation)